To Each, Her Own is a 2018 romantic comedy film directed by Myriam Aziza. The film released on 24 June 2018 on Netflix. The film explores family, religion, race, gender, sexual orientation, nationality and other prejudices through comedy.

Cast
 Sarah Stern as Simone Benloulou - Sister
 Jean-Christophe Folly as Wali
 Julia Piaton as Claire - Simone's girlfriend
 Catherine Jacob as Noelle Benloulou - Mother
 Richard Berry as Norbert Benloulou - Father
 Arié Elmaleh as David Benloulou - Brother
 Clémentine Poidatz as Geraldine da Coste - Co-worker
 Stéphane Debac as Eric Taieb - Geraldine's boyfriend
 Sophie Mounicot as Sylvie Lopez
 David Houri as Matt Benloulou - Brother
 Lionel Lingelser as Nathaniel - Matt's boyfriend

References

External links
 

2018 romantic comedy films
2018 films
French romantic comedy films
French-language Netflix original films
2010s French films